Missouri Branch is an unincorporated community in Wayne County, West Virginia, United States.

The community takes its name from nearby Missouri Branch Creek.

References

Unincorporated communities in Wayne County, West Virginia
Unincorporated communities in West Virginia